The ICCF England belongs to the ICCF national member federations.

Creation of EFCC
1962 saw the formation of the British Postal Chess Federation (BPCF).  The name was changed to the British Federation of Correspondence Chess (BFCC) in 1999, and then again to English Federation for Correspondence Chess (2015).

Principal Achievements
Great Britain won the Gold Medal in Olympiad IX  and thereafter the same followed up to gain the Silver Medal in Olympiad X representing England.

Grandmaster
Anthony Barnsley  
John G. Brookes                
Dr. Ian S. Brooks                 
Peter Hugh Clarke                    
Peter Coleman         
Richard V. M. Hall                
Adrian Swayne Hollis              
Maurice W. Johnson                  
Peter Richard Markland     
Dr. Peter J. R. Millican              
Jonathan Penrose      
Nigel Edward Povah          
Michael Prizant                   
John Pugh           
Keith Bevin Richardson
Nigel Robson   
Simon Webb

Senior International Master
John Anderson 
Dr. Jerry E. C. Asquith
Ken J. Bowyer 
John Joseph Carleton
Clifford R. Chandler 
Mike J. Conroy 
Gordon H. Davies 
John Kenneth Footner
Clive A. Frostick
Keith Kitson 
Ajoy K. Mukherjee 
Ian M. Pheby
Michael John Read
Charles Rich 
Ian L. Snape 
Jonathan A. Tait 
Trevor Thomas
Paul F. Timson 
Giuseppe Valerio 
Dr. Kevern J. Verney
John Vivante-Sowter

International Master
John F. Adams
David William Anderton
Frank Boyd 
Michael Edward Beech Brigden 
Henry W. Brockbank
Duncan Chambers
Julian Corfield 
Dr. Mike J. Donnelly 
David Ebbett 
Fred J. L. Fraser
Kenneth B. Harman
Michael Howard Horton 
W. F. (Bill) Lumley 
Liam Lynn
Russell M. Pegg 
John D. Rhodes 
Sidney S. Shaw
Chris C. W. Shephard 
Dr. Peter W. H. Smith
Edward C. Sowden 
Peter John Sowray 
Alan Munro Stewart 
Janos I. Suto
Ian D. Thompson
John A. Toothill
Christopher C. Williams
Mike W. Wills

Ladies Grandmaster
Dr. Jill Barber   
Toni Halliwell    
Mrs. Mary E. Jones    
Dawn Williamson

International Ladies Master
Mrs. M. E. E. (Peggy) Clarke

References

External links
 National site

England
Chess in England